The 1st Division was a unit of the Reichswehr, the armed forces of Germany during the Weimar Republic.

Creation 
In the Order of 31 July 1920 for the Reduction of the Army (to comply with the upper limits on the size of the military contained in the Treaty of Versailles), it was determined that in every Wehrkreis (military district) a division would be established by 1 October 1920. The 1st Division was formed in January 1921 out of the Reichswehr-Brigaden 1 and 20, both part of the former Übergangsheer (Transition Army).

It consisted of 3 infantry regiments, the 1st, 2nd and 3rd (Prussian) Infantry Regiments (1. (Preußisches) Infanterie-Regiment; 2. (Preußisches) Infanterie-Regiment; 3. (Preußisches) Infanterie-Regiment). It also included the 1st (Prussian) Artillery Regiment (1. (Preußisches) Artillerie-Regiment), an engineering battalion, a signals battalion, a transportation battalion and a medical battalion. It was subordinated to Gruppenkommando 1.

The commander of the Wehrkreis I was simultaneously the commander of the 1st Division. 
For the leadership of the troops, an Infanterieführer and an Artillerieführer were appointed, both subordinated to the commander of the Division.

Organization 

 1. (Preußisches) Infanterie-Regiment
 2. (Preußisches) Infanterie-Regiment
 3. (Preußisches) Infanterie-Regiment
 1. (Preußisches) Artillerie-Regiment
 Pioneer Battalion
 Signals Battalion
 Transportation Battalion
 Medical Battalion

Divisional commanders 

General of the Infantry Johannes von Dassel (1 October 1920 - 31 October 1923)
Generaloberst Wilhelm Heye (1 November 1923 - 31 October 1926)
General of the Infantry Friedrich Freiherr von Esebeck (1 November 1926 - 30 September 1929)
General of the Infantry Werner von Blomberg (1 October 1929 - 30 January 1933)
Generalleutnant Walther von Brauchitsch (1 February 1933 - 1 October 1934)

Infanterieführers 
Generalleutnant Johannes Ehrhardt (1 Oct 1920 - 1 Jan 1922)
Generalleutnant Hugo van den Bergh (11 Jan 1922 - 31 Jan 1924)
Generalmajor Robert Bürkner (1 Feb 1924 - 19 Mar 1925)
Generalmajor Hermann Niethammer (19 Mar 1925 - 31 Jan 1928)
Generalmajor Albert Fett (1 Feb 1928 - 31 Jan 1929)
Generalmajor Kurt Fischer (1 Feb 1929 - 31 Oct 1930)
Generalleutnant Karl Held (1 Nov 1930 - 30 Sep 1931)
Generalleutnant Karl von Roques (1 Oct 1931 - 31 Jan 1933)
Generalmajor Günther von Niebelschütz (1 Feb 1933 - 15 Oct 1935)

The unit ceased to exist as such after October 1934, and its subordinate units were transferred to the 11, 21 Divisions newly created in that year. The 1. (Preußisches) Infanterie-Regiment provided the personnel for the infantry regiments of the 1st Infantry Division of the new Wehrmacht.

Garrisons 
The divisional headquarters was in Königsberg.

References

 Feldgrau.com

Infantry divisions of Germany
Military units and formations established in 1920
Military units and formations disestablished in 1934